Vasilyevka is a rural locality (a village) in Nebylovskoye Rural Settlement, Yuryev-Polsky District, Vladimir Oblast, Russia. The population was 18 as of 2010.

Geography 
Vasilyevka is located on the Yakhroma River, 40 km southeast of Yuryev-Polsky (the district's administrative centre) by road. Chekovo is the nearest rural locality.

References 

Rural localities in Yuryev-Polsky District